The 2013 Monte-Carlo Rolex Masters was a men's tennis tournament for male professional players, played from 13 April through 22 April 2013, on outdoor clay courts. It was the 107th edition of the annual Monte Carlo Masters tournament, which was sponsored by Rolex for the fifth time. It took place at the Monte Carlo Country Club in Roquebrune-Cap-Martin, France, near Monte Carlo, Monaco.

Rafael Nadal was the eight-time defending champion, but suffered his first defeat at the tournament since his debut in 2003 (he missed the tournament in 2004 due to injury), by losing in the final to Novak Djokovic. The defeat ended a 46-match winning streak dating back to the first of his eight consecutive titles at the tournament, in 2005.

Points and prize money

Points distribution
Because the Monte Carlo Masters is the non-mandatory Masters 1000 event, special rules regarding points distribution are in place. The Monte Carlo Masters counts as one of a player's 500 level tournaments, while distributing Masters 1000 points.

Prize money

Singles main draw entrants

Seeds

Rankings are as of April 8, 2013

Other entrants
The following players received wildcards into the main draw:
  Benjamin Balleret
  Juan Martín del Potro
  John Isner
  Gaël Monfils

The following players received entry via qualifying:
  Pablo Andújar
  Daniel Brands
  Victor Hănescu
  Jesse Huta Galung
  Albert Montañés
  Albert Ramos
  Édouard Roger-Vasselin

Withdrawals
 Before the tournament
  David Ferrer (thigh injury)
  Tommy Haas
  Feliciano López

Doubles main draw entrants

Seeds

 Rankings are as of April 8, 2013

Other entrants
The following pairs received wildcards into the doubles main draw:
  Benjamin Balleret /  Guillaume Couillard
  Fabio Fognini /  Nicolas Mahut

Finals

Singles

 Novak Djokovic defeated  Rafael Nadal, 6–2, 7–6(7–1)

Doubles

 Julien Benneteau /  Nenad Zimonjić defeated  Bob Bryan /  Mike Bryan, 4–6, 7–6(7–4), [14–12]

References

External links
 
 Association of Tennis Professionals (ATP) tournament profile